Nicolaas Johannes Luus (born 31 March 1977 in Klerksdorp, North West, South Africa) is a South African rugby union player who plays for club side QBR. He can play either as a lock or as a flanker.

Notes

1977 births
Living people
South African rugby union players
Rugby union locks
Rugby union players from North West (South African province)
Golden Lions players
Lions (United Rugby Championship) players